Trudolyubovka is a rural locality (a selo) in Nizhnekatukhovskoye Rural Settlement, Novousmansky District, Voronezh Oblast, Russia. The population was 101 as of 2010. There are 4 streets.

Geography 
Trudolyubovka is located 37 km east of Novaya Usman (the district's administrative centre) by road. Nizhnyaya Katukhovka is the nearest rural locality.

References 

Rural localities in Novousmansky District